Split Image is the debut album by Excel, released in 1987. It is the band's first album as Welcome to Venice is a compilation album with Suicidal Tendencies, Beowülf, No Mercy and Los Cycos. Compared to their later works, this album sees Excel play thrash metal with hardcore punk and doom metal influences.

Track listing
 "Your Life, My Life" – 3:17
 "Insecurity" – 2:12
 "Split Image" – 5:12
 "Never Look Away" – 3:41
 "Wreck Your World" – 2:54
 "Social Security" – 2:36
 "Set Yourself Apart" – 2:22
 "The Joke's on You" – 2:46
 "Looking for You" – 2:58
 "Spare the Pain" – 5:15

2000 re-release bonus tracks:
 "Sonic Decapitation"
 "No Deal"
 "Split Image"
 "Insecurity"
 "Looking for You"
 "Spare the Pain"
 "Gods of Power"
 "Blitz & Confinement"
 "Enforcer"
 "Conclusion"
 "Make Up Your Mind"

Personnel 
 Dan Clements – vocals
 Adam Siegel – guitars
 Shaun Ross – bass guitar
 Greg Saenz – drums

Excel (band) albums
1987 debut albums
Caroline Records albums